The Los Altos History Museum (LAHM) is a museum in Los Altos, California. Founded in 2001, the museum showcases the history of Los Altos and surrounding areas, including the transformation of the agricultural paradise once known as the "Valley of Heart's Delight" into the high-tech Silicon Valley. The Los Altos History Museum is situated in one of the few remaining apricot orchards in the San Francisco Bay area.

The museum features both a permanent exhibit as well as temporary exhibits. The permanent exhibit is called "Crown of the Peninsula" and describes the history of the city of Los Altos, featuring a diorama of Los Altos as it appeared in 1932 with an operational O-scale model train representing the rail line through town that was removed in 1964 and replaced by Foothill Expressway.

References

External links
 

History museums in California
Museums in Santa Clara County, California
Los Altos, California
Agriculture museums in the United States
Houses in Santa Clara County, California
Historic house museums in California